Nicola Walter Chiarella (born 30 July 1963) is an Italian former footballer who played as a right winger.

Playing career
Chiarella began his professional career with Foggia in 1980, and subsequently transferred to Lanciano the following year, where he scored two goals in 18 matches.

Later, Chiarella played in many teams in the lower Italian division, such as Manfredonia, Foggia once again, Pro Italia Galatina, and Nola, where he was the top scorer.

In 1986, he transferred to Catanzaro, staying for two years and scoring ten goals in 47 matches (20 of these matches were played in Serie B).

In 1989 Chiarella transferred to Ternana, where he remained until 1991, scoring 3 goals in 20 games. Later Chiarella was unjustly banned for two years for corruption charges. He moved to Bisceglie in Serie B the following season where he once again scored only two goals in six matches. Afterwards, he returned to Foggia in serie A in 1994, but did not play for the club. The following seasons Chiarella played in lower-division Italian teams, such as Campobasso, Tricase, Sanità Nola, Giugliano, until he retired in 2000, after one season with Audace Cerignola.

Coaching career
Chiarella started his coaching career in 2001 with Barletta. Later, in 2006, he managed the Foggia under 15 team, called Giovanissimi.
In 2009 Chiarella signed with Monti Dauni in Promozione Molise, and later won the tournament, which led to his team being promoted to Eccellenza Molise; however, in December 2010, he quit his job. In October 2011 he became Foggia's second coach.

Trivia
In Giovanni Trapattoni's first match with Internazionale, in the 1986–87 Coppa Italia at the San Siro stadium in Milan, Chiarella scored a goal for Catanzaro, although the match eventually finished in a 4–1 away defeat to Inter.

References

Italian footballers
1963 births
Living people
Association football wingers
Manfredonia Calcio players
Calcio Foggia 1920 players
Matera Calcio players
S.S.C. Giugliano players
S.S.D. Città di Campobasso players
A.S. Bisceglie Calcio 1913 players
Ternana Calcio players
U.S. Catanzaro 1929 players